Hari Singh AVSM (24 October 1922 – 14 March 2003) was a brigadier in the Indian Army who played a significant role in the Indo-Pakistani War of 1965. He was awarded the Ati Vishisht Seva Medal by the President of India for rendering distinguished service of an exceptional order.

See also 
Indo-Pakistani War of 1965
Indian 1st Armoured Division
List of regiments of the Indian Army

References

Military personnel of the Indo-Pakistani War of 1965
People from Udaipur
1922 births
2003 deaths
Military personnel from Rajasthan
People from Pali district